is a retired female field hockey player from Japan. She represented her country at the Summer Olympics three times (2004, 2008 and 2012).

Kato was the oldest participant (33 years, 245 days) in the Japanese Women's Squad at the 2004 Summer Olympics in Athens, Greece. She captained the national side since 2005.

External links
 
 

1970 births
Living people
Japanese female field hockey players
Field hockey players at the 2004 Summer Olympics
Field hockey players at the 2008 Summer Olympics
Olympic field hockey players of Japan
Sportspeople from Saitama Prefecture
Asian Games medalists in field hockey
Field hockey players at the 2012 Summer Olympics
Field hockey players at the 1994 Asian Games
Field hockey players at the 2002 Asian Games
Field hockey players at the 2006 Asian Games
Field hockey players at the 2010 Asian Games
Asian Games silver medalists for Japan
Asian Games bronze medalists for Japan
Medalists at the 1994 Asian Games
Medalists at the 2002 Asian Games
Medalists at the 2006 Asian Games
Medalists at the 2010 Asian Games